Hélio Filipe Dias de Sousa (born 12 August 1969) is a Portuguese former professional footballer who played as a central midfielder, currently manager of the Bahrain national team.

Playing career
Known by his first name in his playing days, Hélio was born in Setúbal and played his entire career with hometown club Vitória Futebol Clube. Being team captain from an early age, he first appeared with the main squad during the 1987–88 season, and went on to experience promotions and relegations alike throughout 18 professional campaigns, being an undisputed starter in ten of those (three in the second division).

Hélio retired at almost 36, after helping Vitória to the 2005 Portuguese Cup in a 2–1 final win against S.L. Benfica, having played 423 league games – club best – and scoring 21 goals. Internationally, he was part of Portugal's squad at the 1989 FIFA World Youth Championship, which was won in Saudi Arabia; in 1994, he earned one cap for the full side.

Coaching career
After retiring, Sousa moved into management. Beginning with his only professional club, he moved in 2008–09 to S.C. Covilhã, helping it retain its second-tier status.

Sousa took the reins of the national team's under-18s in August 2010. He was in charge of several youth categories at the Portuguese Football Federation in the following years.

On 29 July 2018, Sousa led the under-19 team to their first-ever UEFA European Championship after a 4–3 extra time defeat of Italy in Seinäjoki. The following March, he replaced Miroslav Soukup at the helm of Bahrain, but was still in charge of the Portuguese under-20s at the 2019 World Cup, which ended in group stage elimination.

On 14 August 2019, Sousa led Bahrain to their first ever regional title after defeating Iraq 1–0 in the WAFF Championship. On 8 December, he was also on the bench as the team won their first Arabian Gulf Cup, 1–0 against Saudi Arabia.

Honours

Player
Vitória Setúbal
Taça de Portugal: 2004–05

Portugal
FIFA U-20 World Cup: 1989

Manager
Vitória Setúbal
Taça de Portugal runner-up: 2005–06

Portugal U17
UEFA European Under-17 Championship: 2016

Portugal U19
UEFA European Under-19 Championship: 2018

Bahrain
WAFF Championship: 2019
Persian Gulf Cup: 2019

See also
List of one-club men

References

External links

1969 births
Living people
Sportspeople from Setúbal
Portuguese footballers
Association football midfielders
Primeira Liga players
Liga Portugal 2 players
Vitória F.C. players
Portugal youth international footballers
Portugal under-21 international footballers
Portugal international footballers
Portuguese football managers
Primeira Liga managers
Liga Portugal 2 managers
Vitória F.C. managers
S.C. Covilhã managers
Bahrain national football team managers
Portuguese expatriate football managers
Expatriate football managers in Bahrain
Portuguese expatriate sportspeople in Bahrain